SAMtools is a set of utilities for interacting with and post-processing short DNA sequence read alignments in the SAM (Sequence Alignment/Map), BAM (Binary Alignment/Map) and CRAM formats, written by Heng Li. These files are generated as output by short read aligners like BWA. Both simple and advanced tools are provided, supporting complex tasks like variant calling and alignment viewing as well as sorting, indexing, data extraction and format conversion. SAM files can be very large (tens of Gigabytes is common), so compression is used to save space. SAM files are human-readable text files, and BAM files are simply their binary equivalent, whilst CRAM files are a restructured column-oriented binary container format. BAM files are typically compressed and more efficient for software to work with than SAM. SAMtools makes it possible to work directly with a compressed BAM file, without having to uncompress the whole file. Additionally, since the format for a SAM/BAM file is somewhat complex - containing reads, references, alignments, quality information, and user-specified annotations - SAMtools reduces the effort needed to use SAM/BAM files by hiding low-level details. 

As third-party projects were trying to use code from SAMtools despite it not being designed to be embedded in that way, the decision was taken in August 2014 to split the SAMtools package into a stand-alone software library with a well-defined API (HTSlib), a project for variant calling and manipulation of variant data (BCFtools), and the stand-alone SAMtools package for working with sequence alignment data.

Usage and commands
Like many Unix commands, SAMtool commands follow a stream model, where data runs through each command as if carried on a conveyor belt. This allows combining multiple commands into a data processing pipeline. Although the final output can be very complex, only a limited number of simple commands are needed to produce it. If not specified, the standard streams (stdin, stdout, and stderr) are assumed. Data sent to stdout are printed to the screen by default but are easily redirected to another file using the normal Unix redirectors (> and >>), or to another command via a pipe (|).

SAMtools commands
SAMtools provides the following commands, each invoked as "".

 view  The  command filters SAM or BAM formatted data. Using options and arguments it understands what data to select (possibly all of it) and passes only that data through. Input is usually a sam or bam file specified as an argument, but could be sam or bam data piped from any other command. Possible uses include extracting a subset of data into a new file, converting between BAM and SAM formats, and just looking at the raw file contents. The order of extracted reads is preserved.
 sort  The  command sorts a BAM file based on its position in the reference, as determined by its alignment. The element + coordinate in the reference that the first matched base in the read aligns to is used as the key to order it by. [TODO: verify]. The sorted output is dumped to a new file by default, although it can be directed to stdout (using the -o option). As sorting is memory intensive and BAM files can be large, this command supports a sectioning mode (with the -m options) to use at most a given amount of memory and generate multiple output file. These files can then be merged to produce a complete sorted BAM file [TODO - investigate the details of this more carefully].
 index   The  command creates a new index file that allows fast look-up of data in a (sorted) SAM or BAM. Like an index on a database, the generated  or  file allows programs that can read it to more efficiently work with the data in the associated files.
 tview   The  command starts an interactive ascii-based viewer that can be used to visualize how reads are aligned to specified small regions of the reference genome. Compared to a graphics based viewer like IGV, it has few features. Within the view, it is possible to jumping to different positions along reference elements (using 'g') and display help information ('?').
 mpileup   The  command produces a  pileup format (or BCF) file giving, for each genomic coordinate, the overlapping read bases and indels at that position in the input BAM files(s). This can be used for SNP calling for example.
 flagstat

Examples
 view
 samtools view sample.bam > sample.sam
Convert a bam file into a sam file.
 samtools view -bS sample.sam > sample.bam
Convert a sam file into a bam file. The  option compresses or leaves compressed input data.
 samtools view sample_sorted.bam "chr1:10-13"
Extract all the reads aligned to the range specified, which are those that are aligned to the reference element named chr1 and cover its 10th, 11th, 12th or 13th base. The results is saved to a BAM file including the header. An index of the input file is required for extracting reads according to their mapping position in the reference genome, as created by samtools index.
 samtools view -h -b sample_sorted.bam "chr1:10-13" > tiny_sorted.bam
Extract the same reads as above, but instead of displaying them, writes them to a new bam file, tiny_sorted.bam. The  option makes the output compressed and the  option causes the SAM headers to be output also. These headers include a description of the reference that the reads in sample_sorted.bam were aligned to and will be needed if the tiny_sorted.bam file is to be used with some of the more advanced SAMtools commands. The order of extracted reads is preserved.

 tview
 samtools tview sample_sorted.bam
Start an interactive viewer to visualize a small region of the reference, the reads aligned, and mismatches. Within the view, can jump to a new location by typing g: and a location, like . Typing  brings up help information for scroll movement, colors, views, ...
 samtools tview -p chrM:1 sample_chrM.bam UCSC_hg38.fa
Set start position and compare.
 samtools tview -d T -p chrY:10,000,000 sample_chrY.bam UCSC_hg38.fa >> save.txt
 <code class="plainlinks">samtools tview -d H -p chrY:10,000,000 sample_chrY.bam UCSC_hg38.fa >> save.html</code>
Save screen in .txt or .html.
 sort
 samtools sort -o sorted_out unsorted_in.bam
Read the specified unsorted_in.bam as input, sort it by aligned read position, and write it out to sorted_out. Type of output can be either sam, bam, or cram, and will be determined automatically by sorted_out's file-extension.
 samtools sort -m 5000000 unsorted_in.bam sorted_out
Read the specified unsorted_in.bam as input, sort it in blocks up to 5 million k (5 Gb) and write output to a series of bam files named sorted_out.0000.bam, sorted_out.0001.bam, etc., where all bam 0 reads come before any bam 1 read, etc.
 index
 samtools index sorted.bam
Creates an index file, sorted.bam.bai for the sorted.bam'' file.

See also 
 DNA sequencing
 Pileup format

References

External links 

 Home page for the SAMtools project
 SAMtools commands
 Wiki page at SeqAnswers for the SAMtools software (stub as of 2012-02-26.) broken link
 Mathematical notes on SAMtools algorithms from its primary author
 Short, somewhat specialized tutorial on SAMtools from EMBL. broken link

Bioinformatics algorithms
Bioinformatics software
DNA sequencing
Public-domain software